is a Japanese actor and singer from Yokohama, Kanagawa Prefecture. Kuroswa joined Toho film studio as an actor and made his film debut with Hibari Chiemi Izumi Sanninyoreba in 1964. His first starring role was in the 1966 film Hikinige. In 1971, Kurosawa left Toho and became a freelance actor.

His song Tokiniwa Shōfu no Yōni became a big hit in 1978.

Selected filmography

Film

 Hibari・Chiemi・Izumi Sanninyoreba (1964)
 Samurai Assassin (1965)
 Ereki no Wakadaishō (1965) as Izawa
 Hikinige (1966)
 Izu no Odoriko (1966)
 The Stranger Within a Woman (1966) as Bartender
 Japan's Longest Day (1967) as Hatanaka Kenji
 Admiral Yamamoto (1968) as Kimura Keisuke
 Hymn to a Tired Man (1969) as Zensaku's son
 Battle of the Japan Sea (1969) as Pfc. Maeyama Sankichi
 Yajyū-toshi (1970) 
 The Militarists (1970) as Shimagaki
 Hakuchu no Shugeki (1970)
 The Wolves (1971) as Tsutomu Onodera
 The Water Margin (1972) as Shi Wengong
 The Human Revolution (1973)
 Lady Snowblood (1973) as Ryūrei Ashio
 Horror of the Wolf (1973) as Akira Jin
 Battles Without Honor and Humanity: Police Tactics (1974) as Shigeru Takemoto
 EVIL OF DRACULA (1974) as Shiraki
 Prophecies of Nostradamus (1974) as Akira Nakagawa
 Karafuto 1945 Summer Hyosetsu no Mon (1974) as Muraguchi
 Best Guy (1990) as Lt. Colonel Tadayuki "Odyssey" Yamamoto
 Kimi no Manazashi (2017)

Television
 Hissatsu Shiokinin (1973) (ep.4) as Seiten no Masagorō
 The Water Margin (1973) as Dai Zong
 Kage Dōshin II (1975–76) as Hotta Genpachiro
 Japan Sinks (1974–75) 
 Kusa Moeru (1979) as Kokemaru
 Doberman Deka (1980) as Jōji Kanō
 The Hungman (1980–82)
 Aoi (2000) as Natsuka Masaie

References

External links

1944 births
Living people
Japanese male film actors
Japanese male television actors
Actors from Yokohama
20th-century Japanese male actors
21st-century Japanese male actors